Yapraklı District is a district of the Çankırı Province of Turkey. Its seat is the town of Yapraklı. Its area is 741 km2, and its population is 7,646 (2021).

Composition
There is one municipality in Yapraklı District:
 Yapraklı 

There are 38 villages in Yapraklı District:

 Aşağıöz
 Ayseki
 Ayvaköy
 Bademçay
 Balıbıdık
 Belibedir
 Buğay
 Buluca
 Büyükakseki
 Çakırlar
 Çevrecik
 Çiçekköy
 Davutlar
 Doğanbey
 Gürmeç
 İkizören
 Karacaözü
 Kayacık
 Kaymaz
 Kirliakça
 Kıvcak
 Kullar
 Müsellim
 Ovacık
 Sarıkaya
 Sazcığaz
 Şeyhosman
 Sofuoğlu
 Subaşı
 Topuzsaray
 Yakadere
 Yakaköy
 Yamaçbaşı
 Yenice
 Yeşilyayla
 Yukarıöz
 Yüklü
 Zekeriyaköy

References

Districts of Çankırı Province